ThinkHotels.com was a British online hotel booking portal, registered with British Hospitality Association which was established in 2012.

The site is inactive as of late 2020.

Partnerships
In 2013, the company gained B2B partnerships with TripAdvisor, a  travel website.

References

British travel websites
Hotel and leisure companies based in London
Online travel agencies
Hospitality companies established in 2012
Internet properties established in 2012
2012 establishments in the United Kingdom